"Christmas Wrapping" is a Christmas song by the American new wave band the Waitresses. First released on ZE Records' 1981 compilation album A Christmas Record, it later appeared on the band's 1982 EP I Could Rule the World If I Could Only Get the Parts and numerous other holiday compilation albums. It was written and produced by Chris Butler, with vocals by Patty Donahue. The song received positive reviews; AllMusic described it as "one of the best holiday pop tunes ever recorded".

Writing
In 1981, ZE Records asked each of its artists to record a Christmas song for a compilation album, A Christmas Record. The Waitresses were in the middle of a difficult tour and the Christmas song commission was "the last thing we wanted", Butler said later.

Butler wrote the song that August, assembling it from assorted unused riffs. He finished the lyrics in a taxi on the way to the recording studio, Electric Lady Studios in Greenwich Village. Butler said the lyrics came from his hatred of Christmas: "Everybody I knew in New York was running around like a bunch of fiends. It wasn't about joy. It was something to cope with." The bassist, Tracy Wormworth, was inspired by Bernard Edwards' bassline on the recently released "Good Times" by Chic.

Written while hip hop music was beginning to gain prominence, "Christmas Wrapping" is "almost rapped" by Donahue. Its title, a pun on "rapping", alludes to the 1979 song "Christmas Rappin'" by Kurtis Blow. Butler said he also "liked the idea of the word 'wrap,' like a wraparound, because the story is circular".

Lyrics
"Christmas Wrapping" is told from the perspective of a single woman determined not to participate in the exhausting holiday season after a year so busy she has been unable to go on a date with a man she met months ago. Preparing to dine alone on Christmas Eve, she runs into the man in a grocery store, bringing "the year to a very happy ending".

Release
"Christmas Wrapping" was released as a single in the UK in 1981 on Island Records. It did not initially make the charts, but was reissued in 1982 and reached No. 45 on the UK Singles Chart that December. It remains the Waitresses' highest-charting single in the UK. 

Butler said the reception was a rejuvenating gift for the band: "We do the Christmas song, forget about it and go back on the road. The next thing I know when calling back to New York is that it's all over the radio and much to our surprise it leaps over our heads and hits all the cities where we're heading and all of a sudden we're back on an upswing again."

Legacy 
In 2005, Guardian journalist Dorian Lynskey called the song "fizzing, funky dance-around-the-Christmas-tree music for Brooklyn hipsters". In 2012, the Daily Telegraph writer Bernadette McNulty called it "one of the most charming, insouciant festive songs ever". The AllMusic reviewer Andy Hinds called it "one of the best holiday pop tunes ever recorded".

During the 2016 Christmas season, it re-entered the singles chart at number 96. 

The song appears in numerous holiday-music compilations, including The Edge of Christmas, Dr. Demento's Holidays in Dementia, and Now That's What I Call Christmas!: The Signature Collection.

The song has been used in films including The Tomorrow War (2021) and The Guardians of the Galaxy Holiday Special (2022).

Each festive season, Butler makes a donation to the Akron-Summit County children's library in the name of the first person to tell him they heard "Christmas Wrapping" on the radio.

Covers
"Christmas Wrapping" was covered by the British pop group Spice Girls as a B-side for their 1998 single "Goodbye", with lyrics altered to include a reference to British supermarket chain Tesco instead of the American chain A&P. It has also been covered by Save Ferris (with lyrics altered for a Jewish perspective), Kate Nash,  the Front Bottoms, the Donnas, Summer Camp, the cast of the Broadway musical Wicked, Miranda Cosgrove covered the song for the movie Merry Christmas, Drake & Josh, comedian Doug Benson, Martha Wainwright, the cast of the TV show Glee (with Heather Morris on lead vocals), Disney Channel star Bella Thorne, Haim, and Electric Six. British/Irish girl band the Saturdays covered the song for the film Get Santa. Kylie Minogue recorded the song with Iggy Pop for her 2015 album, Kylie Christmas.

Sinkane, studying a Masters in composition, produced a cover for Christmas 2020. It featured Nancy Whang (LCD Soundsystem) singing lead, Nick Millhiser (Holy Ghost!) on drums, and Money Mark (The Beastie Boys) on Moog. Profits from this release went to The Food Bank for New York City.

Track listings and formats
 UK 7" Vinyl
 "Christmas Wrapping"  – 3:55
 "Hangover 1/1/83"  – 4:30
 UK 12" Vinyl
 "Christmas Wrapping" (Long Version) – 5:23
 "Hangover 1/1/83"  – 4:30
 CD Single
 "Christmas Wrapping" (Single Edit Version) – 4:30
 "Christmas Wrapping" (Long Version) – 5:23
 "Hangover 1/1/83"  – 4:30

Credits and personnel
Credits and personnel are adapted from "Christmas Wrapping" vinyl liner notes.
 Patty Donahue – vocals
 Tracy Wormworth – bass, vocals
 Billy Ficca – drums
 Dan Klayman – keys
 Chris Butler – guitars, producer
 Mars Williams – sax, horn arrangements
 Dave Buck – trumpet
 Mike Firondelli – engineering

Charts

Certifications

References

External links
 
 
 "Couldn't miss this one this year: The surprisingly complex legacy of the Waitresses' 'Christmas Wrapping'," by Lyndsey Parker, Dec. 21, 2021

1981 singles
1982 singles
1998 singles
2008 singles
American Christmas songs
The Waitresses songs
Kylie Minogue songs
Spice Girls songs
Miranda Cosgrove songs
1981 songs